is a Japanese anime television series directed by Koichi Ohata, from a screenplay by Fumihiko Shimo. It was produced by the Gonzo animation studio. Burst Angel takes place in the near future, after a rise in criminal activity forced the Japanese government to allow citizens to possess firearms and establish the Recently Armed Police of Tokyo (RAPT). The series follows a band of four mercenaries, named Jo, Meg, Sei, and Amy. It was broadcast for twenty-four episodes on TV Asahi from April to September 2004. An original video animation, Burst Angel Infinity, was released in 2007.

Plot

In the near future, due to an unusual rise in criminal activity, it has become legal to possess firearms in Japan so lawful citizens can protect themselves. At the same time, the government established the Recently Armed Police of Tokyo, whose methods are exterminating criminals rather than arresting them.

The story opens with Kyohei Tachibana, a male college student at a culinary arts school with dreams of someday becoming a pastry chef, motorcycling down an inner city street and becoming caught up in a shoot-out between a mysterious silver-haired woman and a psycho gangster. Kyohei escapes unharmed and ends up working as a cook for Jo, Meg, Amy, and Sei in an effort to gather up enough money to travel to France. The girls, ranging in ages of eleven to nineteen, turn out to be pseudo-mercenary agents for a larger international group known as Bailan.

Burst Angel focuses on the group as they investigate a series of mutated human monsters with glowing brains that cause various amounts of mayhem in Tokyo.

Characters

Main
Three of the four girls (Jo, Meg, and Amy) are named after the March sisters in the novel Little Women.

Jo is the muscle of the group, as well as the pilot of Django, which she uses to carry out various missions for Sei and to help out her friends when they're in need, mainly Meg. Jo also puts Meg over anything else, which she stated when telling Meg that she fights for her. It is heavily implied throughout the series that she has romantic feelings for Meg. When she is not fighting, she enjoys watching horror or gore related movies. Jo would eventually rediscover her past as a genetically engineered war machine in human form. After being forced to surrender with Meg and others held hostage, Jo returns to the secret labs for reprogramming and conditioning at Hinode. Jo's counterpart, Maria, frees her and Meg to prove who was the strongest by re-staging the fight they were unable to finish in their past. After the fight between Maria and Jo, which pushes both of them to their limits, Maria loses her will to fight and is restored to her true humanity. Reunited with the group, Jo decides that she has to destroy RAPT. Against Meg's will, who is highly opposed to the idea after seeing her go through a lifetime of combat, Jo knocks Meg out for her own safety, bids her farewell, and leaves her jacket behind for her to remember her by. ADR Director Christopher Bevins comments that Jo is "like a female cross between Clint Eastwood and Wolverine".

Meg has red hair (although in her first appearance chronologically in episode 14: "Wild Kids", she is portrayed as having black hair due to the monochrome setting) and dresses like a cowgirl. She carries a small revolver, and, at times, a large anti-tank rifle. Meg is highly prone to be captured, only to be rescued by Jo. She is the very best of friends with Jo and is 100% loyal only to her. Meg was once an orphan in New York City with several other children until she encountered Jo. Since then, Meg and Jo partnered and became bounty hunters together. Her personality is one of the main differences between anime and manga, while the anime tries to keep her relationship with Jo on the verge of friendly affection and subtle subtext, the manga prequel quite openly shows that Meg is experiencing a sexual attraction to her friend, fantasizing about their sex or even openly trying to seduce Jo. The other children appeared to have been adopted by a police officer. After she finds out Jo's origin, she feels that Jo should no longer fight. Jo however knocks her out and leaves her jacket with her. At the end of the series, Meg makes her way to the ruined RAPT HQ and sees Jo's scarf tied on a piece of debris. Meg then says her final goodbye to Jo. The final scene shows Meg in Jo's outfit, in a scene very much paralleling the beginning of the opening titles, only with an Orange Django behind her. In the Newtype magazine article, Meg is the "'spunky act now, ask questions later' gal" and that voice actor Jamie Marchi "brilliantly captured Meg's What-ever attitude".

She is the kind leader of the group who hires Jo and Meg to become members of Bailan. She wears a long blue jacket and her black hair in a bun. Sei's grandfather runs Bailan and comes from a very powerful Chinese family. Sei was born and raised as a traditional Chinese girl and was trained in various ways of her clan/syndicate. After her grandfather stepped down as leader of the clan, their current clan members made a partnership with RAPT to preserve their clan. However, such actions not only disgusted Sei, she was also forced to do many things for RAPT in Bailan's name. She eventually rebelled against her own organization under the advice of her grandfather. Along with Jo she was caught in the explosion after destroying RAPT HQ and is presumably dead. In the Newtype magazine article, Bevins comments that Sei's character is cold, business-like, and notes that Clarine Harp's personality of sarcastic exterior, but most caring and fiercely loyal interior, "that's Sei to a T".

A young genius in computer and technology. She was saved and recruited by Sei after her hacking drew attention from the authorities in her own country. It was through her hacking skills that Sei managed to recruit Jo and Meg. She often argues with Meg in a friendly way and loves scarfing down Kyohei's various treats. Her hair is light brown, and worn in pigtails. Amy's often seen carrying a pink stuffed animal that contains a laptop. In the Newtype magazine article, Bevins comments that "while Amy is just as brainy as Conan" (the title character in Case Closed, and also voiced by Retzloff), "she has a prissy, snotty demeanor that would give the young detective a migraine".

Supporting characters

A student attending a certified culinary school who is proficient in French, Chinese, Italian and Japanese cooking. Kyohei is often seen wearing his chef uniform and riding a small motor scooter which is destroyed by Jo on two occasions. He is hired by Sei as a cook for the girls because their last cook had left. He continues working for the team to earn money to go to France and try becoming a pastry chef.

He is Django's mechanic. Leo hates that Jo plays rough with Django and that Meg annoys him when he's working. He has trouble controlling his urges to act like a child as seen when the team goes to Fortune Island Artificial Beach resort. There, he smashes a go-kart out of the raceway and down the street. Despite being the team's mechanic, he has seen combat on several occasion wielding a pair of sub-machine guns.

A loud-mouthed, bike-riding police officer from Osaka. Takane is often seen riding a chopper and wears a uniform resembling that of a schoolgirl. She carries a large wooden sword, which she swings around often as it symbolizes her leadership of an all girl biker gang who often act as her deputies. She's also efficient at throwing handcuffs and subduing her target. Takane is quick to lose her temper and hates being in debt to anyone. She is also the daughter of the Police Chief of Osaka. After crossing paths with the team however, she becomes attached to the team and assists them any way she can as a debt to Jo even if it means disobeying her father.

Antagonists

The governor of Tokyo and the founder of RAPT. Though he puts on the act of wanting to restore the city as a peaceful crime-free capital, in truth, he relies on ruthless methods for executing criminals and blames other companies and businesses for his shortcomings. Ishihara also makes a deal with Azuma Iriki that he would get total control of Osaka if he agreed to help the governor take over. He explains to Chief Katsu in "Tsutenkaku Tower, Drenched in Tears" that he established RAPT due to his jealousy over Osaka's less toxic community. After many scuffles with Jo's team, Glenford tries to kill Ishihara by trapping him inside a building and using a bomb to destroy it, after which, Glenford replaces him as governor. As it turns out, Ishihara actually survives the explosion and is mutated into a zombie-like beast. During his time as a mutant, Ishihara attackes the underground railways, burning for revenge against Glenford. After emerging from his iron grave, the Ishihara battles Bailan's forces in an organic mech form. After a short yet violent battle, Jo uses Django to kill the zombie.

The leader of RAPT. He organized the creation of the "Genocide Angels" program which leads to the creation of Jo, Maria, and others like them. After organizing the assassination of Ishihara, he takes control of Tokyo and puts it under martial law. His true identity turns out to be a glowing brain placed in a cyborg body.

She is a bio-weapon like Jo, but with even stronger and more violent tendencies. While Jo is more efficient with guns, Maria relies more on bladed weapons such as swords and cutting wire. In the past, both she and Jo were the remaining fighters in a combat exercise to determine the Syndicate's "Genocide Angel." Maria won by default, but as Jo was only rendered unconscious, Maria never felt like she truly defeated Jo. When Jo is captured by RAPT, Maria disobeys orders and kidnaps Meg to lure Jo into one final battle. She lures Jo onto an aircraft carrier similar to the one where Genocide Angel exercise was held. After a hand-to-hand battle, Jo won and Maria lost her will to fight. She asks Jo what she can do after she gains her humanity; Jo only tells her to live on. She then reunites Jo with Meg only to be surrounded by new RAPT Cybots. She tells Meg to escape with Jo while she fights off the new mechs and appears to have been shot dead.

Other characters

A representative from Kokuren and Bailan's Japanese counterpart. His father and Sei's grandfather arrange for him and Sei to wed so that the white and black lotus can join together once again. However, Sei's grandfather respectfully declines Jei's request to have both the Bai Lan and Kokuren seals displayed together. Angry, he and his men attack Sei to try to obtain the Bai Lan seal by force. Jei obtains the seal and almost escapes, but he is stopped by Jo after shooting down the dragon head of the yacht making it crash onto Jei's boat.

The Chief is a well-respected man in Osaka with a great sense of honor and justice. Despite looking like he doesn't care for his daughter, Takane, he actually shows great concern for her. He shows great disgust towards the government of Tokyo and further towards Glenford and RAPT.

A police officer that Meg robbed when she was younger. Based on flashbacks, it is implied that Sam once had a family (a wife and daughter), that are now dead as he carries around his daughter's doll with him. He saves Charlie and Shirley from falling debris at the area Jo was fighting Lava, one of the "Genocide Angel" candidates. Afterward, he adopts all three children while Meg and Jo leave their own way.
The Orphans
There are four orphans, the eldest of whom is Meg. The next oldest is Dorothy, an African-American girl who usually aids Meg in her thefts. Then Charlie, a young Caucasian boy who is usually left to care for Shirley when Meg and Dorothy leave. He is the most cynical of the group. And finally, Shirley, a mute little girl and the youngest of the group. She is the one who finds an unconscious Jo and decides to take her home with them. She carries a book with a picture of an angel with silver hair; something she always points out to everyone and especially towards Jo who she shows great affection for.

An old friend and classmate of Kyohei who always defended him. He is found on the streets by Eiji, a Yakuza member. He takes Akio in and has a doctor convert him into a Cyberoid. He goes on a one man war against the Yakuza. Eiji agrees to a deal with the right-hand man of the Yakuza boss to kill Akio. Eiji fails and ends up being shot several times by an enraged Akio due his betrayal. He tells Kyohei what happened to him and how he became a Cyberoid. After killing off the Yakuza and the Boss, Akio battles Eiji now being converted to a Cyberoid. Akio kills Eiji though he dies in the process leaving Kyohei crying at the loss of his friend.

She is a bio-weapon along with Maria and Jo. Lover is one of the final three survivors in the "Genocide Angel" training exercise (which occurred before Jo is found by Shirley). During the exercise, she almost kills Jo and Maria with missiles from a fighter plane she hot-wired, but is countered by Jo, and ultimately defeated by Maria. However, all three survive the ordeal. She is then sent by the Syndicate to retrieve Jo, but fails.

Media

Anime

Burst Angel, animated by Gonzo, directed by Koichi Ohata and written by Fumihiko Shimo, was broadcast for twenty-four episodes on TV Asahi from April 7 to September 22, 2004. The opening theme for the series is "Loosey" by THE STRiPES while the ending theme is "Under the Sky" by cloudica in Japanese and Caitlin Glass in English.

The complete collection of DVDs from Funimation have been released as of January 2, 2009. This DVD set includes episodes 1–24 and the OVA. The complete collection was later released on Blu-ray on September 29, 2009. The entire series, except the OVA, is also available on PlayStation Network's Video store.

Manga
A prequel to the Burst Angel TV series was created as a manga series titled Angel's Adolescence, it was written and illustrated by Minoru Murao. It was serialization in Media Works' shōnen manga magazine Dengeki Comic Gao! in 2004 and then released as three bound volumes in Japan by Media Works in 2005. The manga is a canonical prequel, and has differences from the anime, depicting the romantic relationship of Jo and Meg.

In 2008, Tokyopop licensed the manga for release in English, and the first volume was released on September 9, 2008.

OVA
Burst Angel Infinity was released in Japan on March 23, 2007. Unlike Angel's Adolescence, the OVA deals is a side story revolving around Jo and Meg visiting Sam and her old gang in New York explaining the aftermath of episode 14 of the TV series. The OVA also includes a short preview titled  by Ugetsu Hakua showing the characters five years in the future, including Jo, Sei and Maria alive. The OVA was released by FUNimation on November 13, 2007.

References

External links

 FUNimation's Official Burst Angel Website
 Tokyopop's Official Burst Angel Manga Website
 

2004 anime television series debuts
2004 manga
2007 anime OVAs
Adventure anime and manga
Anime with original screenplays
Dengeki Comic Gao!
Funimation
Girls with guns anime and manga
Gonzo (company)
Japanese LGBT-related animated television series
Mecha anime and manga
Odex
Shōnen manga
Yuri (genre) anime and manga